Holkhomang Haokip is an veteran Indian politician, who was minister in various Manipur governments and a Member of Parliament during the 13th Lok Sabha.

Haokip was first elected as a member of the Manipur Legislative Assembly in 1972. He was a Member of Consultative Committee, Ministry of Home Affairs, Government of India from 2000–2004.
 The son of Indian National Army (INA) Freedom Fighter and pensioner Shri Chunglet Haokip, Holkhomang worked tirelessly for the upliftment of his people when he was the President of Kuki Inpi, the apex organisation of Kukis in Manipur, since 1995. He was the headmaster of Gandhi Memorial High School at Molnom, in Churachandpur, 1963–1972. Holkhomang was also the President of Kut Festival, a major festival of the Kuki people, for 8 years.

History
 1972–74:	  Member, Manipur Legislative Assembly
 1972–73:	  Minister of State, Industries, Manipur
 1974:	          Minister of State, Revenue, Manipur
 1974–78:	  Minister of State, Works, Manipur Minister of State, Education and Tribal Welfare, Manipur
 1979:	          Chairman, Public Accounts Committee, Manipur Legislative Assembly
 1980:	          Deputy Chairman, State Planning Board, Manipur (with Cabinet Rank)
 1980–84:	  Member, Manipur Legislative Assembly
 1981–84:	  Cabinet Minister, Planning, Industries and Transport, Manipur
 1985–89:	  General Secretary, Pradesh Congress Committee (I), Manipur
 1989–92:	  Cabinet Minister, Industries, Manipur
 1990–95:	  Member, Manipur Legislative Assembly
 1992–95:	  Cabinet Minister, Power, Manipur
 1999:	          Elected to 13th Lok Sabha
 1999–2000:	  Member, Committee on Urban and Rural Development
 2000–2004:	  Member, Consultative Committee, Ministry of Home Affairs

References

Living people
Manipur politicians
Indian National Congress politicians from Manipur
1939 births
People from Kamjong district
Bharatiya Janata Party politicians from Manipur
Manipur MLAs 1972–1974
Manipur MLAs 1974–1979
Manipur MLAs 1980–1984
Manipur MLAs 1990–1995